Revista de Historia Americana y Argentina is a biannual peer-reviewed academic journal specialising in the history of the Americas and Argentina in particular. The journal is indexed in Latindex, Núcleo Básico de Revistas Científicas Argentinas (CAICYT/CONICET), and SciELO. The journal is also part of LatinRev.

References

External links

History of the Americas journals
Biannual journals
Publications established in 1956
Spanish-language journals
1956 establishments in Argentina